Bethlehem Baptist Church is a historic National Baptist church located at 1402 E. Adams Street in Phoenix, Arizona. The church was built circa 1920 and has been active continuously since its opening. The church was designed in the Colonial Revival style. The building's design includes a symmetrical facade, a gable roof with a boxed cornice, and a Greek Revival style entrance featuring a triangular pediment supported by Doric columns.

The church was added to the National Register of Historic Places in 1993.

References

Baptist churches in Arizona
Churches in Phoenix, Arizona
National Register of Historic Places in Phoenix, Arizona
Churches on the National Register of Historic Places in Arizona
Colonial Revival architecture in Arizona